Jay Deelicious: The Delicious Vinyl Years is a compilation album that catalogues hip hop producer J Dilla's early production career. The album showcases Dilla's first work with Pharcyde, and consequently, his rise to fame with other artists. As well all proceeds from the sale of this album will be given to his mother, Maureen (Ma Dukes) Yancey.

Track listing

Disc one
 "Runnin'" (5:05)
 Performed by Pharcyde
 "Sometimes [Remix]" (4:12)
 Performed by Brand New Heavies
 Featuring Q-Tip
 "Somethin' That Means Somethin'" (3:33)
 Performed by Pharcyde
 "She Said [Remix]" (4:25)
 Performed by Pharcyde
 "Whatever You Want"  (4:48)
 Performed by N'Dea Davenport
 "Drop" (5:45)
 Performed by Pharcyde
 "Saturday Night [Remix]" (4:58)
 Performed by Brand New Heavies
 Featuring Mos Def
 "Bullshit" (4:14)
 Performed by Pharcyde
 "Y? [Remix]" (4:55)
 Performed by Pharcyde
 "Bullshittin'" (3:38)
 Performed by N'Dea Davenport
 "Splattitorium" (2:59)
 Performed by Pharcyde

Disc two
 "Runnin' [Instrumental]" (5:03)
 "Sometimes [Remix][Instrumental]" (4:04)
 "Somethin' That Means Somethin' [Instrumental]" (3:33)
 "She Said [Remix][Instrumental]" (4:31)
 "Drop [Instrumental]" (3:50)
 "Saturday Night [Remix][Instrumental]" (5:00)
 "Bullshit [Instrumental]" (4:27)
 "Y? [Remix][Instrumental]" (4:56)
 "Bullshittin' [Remix][Instrumental]" (3:19)

Samples used
"Runnin'" contains samples of "Saudade Vem Correndo" by Stan Getz and "Rock Box" by Run-D.M.C.
"She Said (Remix)" contains a sample of "Central Heating" by Heatwave.
"Drop" contains a sample of "The New Style" by Beastie Boys.
"Bullshit" contains samples of "Sing Me Softly of the Blues" by Gary Burton, "What's Going On (Live)" by Les McCann and "Get Up, Stand Up" by Bob Marley & the Wailers.
"Splattitorium" contains a sample of "Fly Me to the Moon" by Vince Guaraldi.

J Dilla albums
Hip hop compilation albums
Albums produced by J Dilla
2007 compilation albums
2007 remix albums
Delicious Vinyl compilation albums
Hip hop remix albums
Delicious Vinyl remix albums